The 8th Irish Film & Television Awards were held on 12 February 2011 in the Convention Centre, Dublin.

It was hosted by actor Simon Delaney and honoured Irish film and television released in 2010. The Awards show was broadcast live on RTÉ One television in Ireland.

Irish producer Morgan O'Sullivan was presented with the Outstanding Contribution to Industry Award.
The Bosnian war drama As If I Am Not There won the best film, script and director awards.
Martin McCann scooped the lead actor award for his performance in Swansong – Story of Occi Byrne while Amy Huberman received the lead actress award for Rewind.
Pierce Brosnan and Saoirse Ronan both won awards for their supporting roles in the international features The Ghost and The Way Back respectively, while Stephen Rea and Ruth McCabe received IFTAs for their performances in the television drama Single Handed.
In television drama, the fourth and final series of The Tudors was named best drama series/soap which followed awards for the series' craft team in costume design Joan Bergin and make-up and Hair. Live Aid biopic When Harvey Met Bob received the IFTA for single drama/ drama serial and its star Domhnall Gleeson was announced the winner of the rising star award and lead actor television awards.
In the international categories, David Fincher's The Social Network won the IFTA for international film with its star Jesse Eisenberg winning for best international actor. Annette Bening received the international actress award for her performance in The Kids Are All Right.
The Republic of Telly's premiere of the Rubberbandits' Horse Outside took the people's choice award for best TV moment of the year.
The late Gerry Ryan was honoured when his daughter accepted an award on his behalf for Operation Transformation, which won Best Factual Programme.

Awards

Awards in Film
Best Film
As If I Am Not There (Winner)
Perrier's Bounty
Sensation
Swansong
The Runway

Director in Film
Juanita Wilson – As If I Am Not There (Winner)
PJ Dillon – Rewind
Tom Hall – Sensation
Ian Power – The Runway

Script Film
Juanita Wilson- As If I Am Not There (Winner)
Will Collins – My Brothers
Conor McDermottroe – Swansong – Story of Occi Byrne
Mark O'Rowe – Perrier's Bounty

Actor in a lead role – Film
Martin McCann – Swansong – Story of Occi Byrne (Winner)
Colm Meaney – Parked
Cillian Murphy – Perrier's Bounty
Liam Neeson – Chloe

Actor in a Supporting Role – Film
Pierce Brosnan – The Ghost (Winner)
Colin Farrell – The Way Back
Brendan Gleeson – Perrier's Bounty
Cillian Murphy – Inception

Actress in a Supporting Role – Film
 Saoirse Ronan – The Way Back (Winner)
Kerry Condon – The Runway
Marcella Plunkett – Swansong – Story of Occi Byrne
Eileen Walsh – Snap

Feature Documentary
 The Pipe (Winner)
Burma Soldier
Pyjama Girls
What We Leave in Our Wake

International Categories
Best International Film
The Social Network(Winner)
A Prophet
Inception
Toy Story 3

International Actor
Jesse Eisenberg- The Social Network (Winner)
Russell Crowe – The Next Three Days
Leonardo DiCaprio – Inception
Tahar Rahim – A Prophet

International Actress
Annette Bening – The Kids are Alright (Winner)
Helena Bonham Carter – The King's Speech
Jennifer Lawrence – Winter's Bone
Natasha Petrovic – As If I Am Not There

Television Drama Categories
Single Drama / Drama Serial
 When Harvey Met Bob (Winner)
MO
Na Cloigne
The Silence
Wild Decembers

Drama Series / Soap
The Tudors (Winner)
Love/Hate
RAW
Ros na Rún
Single-Handed

Director Television
Dearbhla Walsh – The Silence (Winner)
David Caffrey – Love/Hate
Thaddeus O'Sullivan – Single-Handed
Robert Quinn – Na Cloigne

Writer Television
Stuart Carolan- Love/Hate (Winner)
Darach Ó Scolaí & Lauren Mackenzie – Na Cloigne
Lisa McGee – RAW
Hilary Reynolds – Fair City

Actor in a Lead Role – Television
Domhnall Gleeson – When Harvey Met Bob (Winner)
Owen McDonnell – Single-Handed
Jonathan Rhys Meyers – The Tudors
Robert Sheehan – Love/Hate

Actor in a Supporting Role – Television
Stephen Rea – Single Handed (Winner)
Brian Gleeson – Love/Hate
Seán McGinley – Wild Decembers
Eamon Morrissy – Fair City

Actress in a Supporting Role – Television
 Ruth Bradley – Love/Hate (Winner)
Sarah Bolger – The Tudors
Dervla Kirwan – The Silence
Ruth Negga – Love/Hate

Craft / Technical Categories 
Costume Design
 Joan Bergin – The Tudors (Winner)
Consolata Boyle – Tamara Drewe
Joan O'Cleary – Swansong – Story of Occi Byrne
Susan Scott – Cup Cake

Director of Photography
PJ Dillon – The Runway (Winner)
Tim Fleming – As If I Am Not There
Donal Gilligan – Love/Hate
Owen McPolin – The Silence

Editing
 Emer Reynolds – My Brothers (Winner)
Dermot Diskin – Love/Hate
Guy Montgomery – Parked
Nathan Nugent – As If I Am Not There

Make Up & Hair
Tom McInerney, Dee Corcoran – The Tudors (Winner)
Gill Brennan – Swansong – Story of Occi Byrne
Caroline McCurdy – Na Cloigne
Louise Myler – Parked

Original Score
Ray Harman – Na Cloigne (Winner)
Niall Byrne – Parked
Lance Hogan – Lapland Odyssey
Gary Lightbody & Jacknife Lee – My Brothers

Production Design
Ray Ball – The Runway
Tamara Conboy – Sensation
Tom Conroy – The Tudors
Susie Cullen – The Silence

Sound
Karl Merren, Ken Galvin, Peter Blayney – The Silence
Daniel Birch, Robert Flanagan – Circus Fantasticus
Robert Flanagan, Michelle Cunniffe, Fiadhnait McCann – Essential Killing
Patrick Hanlon, Ken Galvin, Niall Brady – Rewind

Television Categories
Children's / Youth Programme
 Big City Park (Winner)
The Octonauts
Primary School Musical
Seacht

Current Affairs
 Spotlight: The Iris Robinson Investigation (Winner)
Prime Time Investigates – Forgotten Lives
The Frontline
Tonight with Vincent Browne

Documentary Series
 Freefall: The Night The Banks Failed (Winner)
1916 Seachtar na Cásca
Ireland's Greatest
The Truth about Travellers

Documentary
 Voices From The Grave (Winner)
Children in Charge: Ireland's Young Carers
TK Whitaker – Seirbhíseach an Stait
Vanished in the Mountains: Ireland's Missing Women

Entertainment Programme
 Your Bad Self (Winner)
The Apprentice
Feirm Factor
The Model Scouts

Factual Programme
 Operation Transformation (Winner)
Ireland AM
Reeling in the Years
The Eagles Return

Sports Programme 
 In Sunshine Or in Shadow
Graeme McDowell's Major Moment
Gualainn le Gualainn
 World Cup Live

Other Categories
There was a single award for lead actress; the Irish Film and Television Academy claimed that they had "not received sufficient submissions" to have separate awards.

Actress in a lead role – Film/TV
Amy Huberman- Rewind (Winner)
Ruth Bradley – Love/Hate
Orla Brady – Mistresses
Sarah Flood – Fair City
Charlene McKenna – RAW

Short Film
 Small Change (Winner)
Deep End Dance
Noreen
Pentecos

Rising Star Award
Domhnall Gleeson
Antonia Campbell Hughes
Ian Power
Juanita Wilson

Special Irish Language Award
1916 Seachtar na Cásca
An Crisis
Na Cloigne
Ros na Rún

Animation
 The External World
Anam an Amhráin
Head Space
The Octonauts

Outstanding Contribution to Industry 
 Morgan O'Sullivan

References

External links
Official Site

2011 in Irish television
8